Ghazi Airbase or Ghazi Aviation Base is a Pakistan Army Aviation air base located in Haripur District of Khyber-Pakhtunkhwa province in North-West Pakistan.

References

Osama bin Laden
Pakistan Army airbases